Château de Dompierre was a castle near Dompierre-sur-Authie, Hauts-de-France, France. It once belonged to the English and Scottish Balliol family.

The castle of Dompierre was forfeited to the French Crown in 1331 and was later granted to Thomas de Marigny.

Notes

References
Beam, Amanda. G. The Balliol Dynasty, 1210-1364. John Donald, 2008. 

Châteaux in Somme (department)
House of Balliol